The Federación del Rodeo Chileno (Chilean Federation of Rodeo) regulates rodeo events in Chile. Chilean Rodeo, officially the National Sport of Chile.

Originally chartered on January 10, 1962, in Santiago.

External links
 Federación del Rodeo Chileno (in Spanish)

Rodeo in Chile
1962 establishments in Chile